The Phi Kappa Formation is a geologic formation in Idaho. It preserves fossils dating back to the Ordovician period.

See also

 List of fossiliferous stratigraphic units in Idaho
 Paleontology in Idaho

References
 

Ordovician Idaho
Ordovician System of North America
Geologic formations of Idaho
Ordovician southern paleotropical deposits
Silurian southern paleotropical deposits